Farming Simulator is a farming simulation video game series developed by GIANTS Software.  The locations are based on American and European environments. Players are able to farm, breed livestock, grow crops and sell assets created from farming.

The games have sold over 25 million copies combined, as well as had 90 million mobile downloads.
The game is revised, expanded, and re-released each 2 years, (excluding their newest release) with better graphics, a larger array of vehicles and more interesting tasks for the user to perform.

Career 

In career mode, players take on the roles of farmers. Their tasks depend on expanding and upgrading dated equipment and machinery, which can be achieved by harvesting and selling crops.  Players are free to explore the surrounding areas of the map, grow from their choice of several crops, and invest their money in additional fields and equipment.  They can also raise livestock or earn an income from forestry.

Missions 
There are dynamically generated missions that consist of the player performing various tasks within a time frame such as mowing grass, fertilizing fields, or delivering cargo. The player is rewarded with money once the task is finished, plus a bonus based on how quickly the task was completed (excluding Farming Simulator 19,22).

Multiplayer 
Farming Simulator 14 is the first mobile Farming Simulator to have multiplayer mode. Farming Simulator 16 has Bluetooth functionality. Current generation consoles have multiplayer (Farming Simulator on the last generation consoles was the first console port of the game, with all features of 2013 Titanium). Farming Simulator 15 for PlayStation 4 and Xbox One also has a multiplayer mode.

Games

PC and console

Farming Simulator 2008 
Farming Simulator 2008 was released on April 14, 2008 as the first official release of the Farming Simulator game series.

Farming Simulator 2009 
Farming Simulator 2009 is the second game in the series. It had a lot of new features such as new crop types (corn, rapeseed/canola, and barley), modding support and much more machinery, while having the same map as 2008, but remastered.

Farming Simulator 2011 
This is the third game in the series, and first to feature a multiplayer mode. It was greatly expanded with the introduction of a new map. Machinery from Deutz-Fahr, Pöttinger, and Horsch were added (also featured in the FS 2009 Gold edition). Cows were also an addition to this title.

Farming Simulator 2013 

The initial release for Farming Simulator 2013 was on October 26, 2012. A version was released for the PlayStation Vita, PlayStation 3, and Xbox 360 in 2013, known as Farming Simulator. Almost a year after its PC release, it received a large update and re-release under the title Farming Simulator 2013 Titanium Edition, on October 10, 2013. It contains all of the previous assets from the first iteration, with new content of a US-based environment in the form of a map called "Westbridge Hills" and new vehicles. New content was also released as DLC add-ons for those with the original version of the game.

Farming Simulator 15 
Farming Simulator 15 was released to Windows and Mac OS on October 30, 2014. This version introduced forestry, washable vehicles, and 41 brands. Around 140 pieces of equipment are in the base game, 160 in the gold edition DLC pack. Farming Simulator 15 was released to consoles on May 19, 2015.

Farming Simulator 17 
Farming Simulator 17 was released on October 25, 2016. It features the return of Fendt since its last debut in Farming Simulator 2009, and also Massey Ferguson, Challenger, and Valtra. For the first time in the base game, soybeans, sunflowers, and oilseed radishes are introduced as growable crops. In previous games, the player would have had to download a modification to add these crops. The crop growing mechanics have been altered, to allow different ways to increase crop yield. These include fertilizing the fields multiple times throughout the growth stages, plowing the field after a set amount of harvests, de-weeding crops, or using oilseed radish as a cover crop. The missions system were also updated, allowing the player to do work for other in-game farmers. Other additions include drivable trains and an in-game radio. On November 14, 2017, a new expansion pack was released for all platforms. This added a new map, the growth of sugarcane and new vehicles and tools. This was called the platinum expansion pack and is free with the season pass which is also available for all platforms.

Farming Simulator Nintendo Switch Edition
Farming Simulator Nintendo Switch Edition was released on November 7, 2017.  It is a port of Farming Simulator 17 with the same maps, vehicles, etc. No DLC has been released for this title.

Farming Simulator 19
Farming Simulator 19 was released on November 20, 2018. Some key new features include a redesigned graphics engine and the addition of horse farming as well as oat and cotton crops. The game also features John Deere machinery for the first time, as well as Komatsu, Rau, Wilson trailer, and more. Farming Simulator 19 also has a Platinum Expansion containing 37 pieces of Claas machinery (or 41 if pre-ordered). The 6th DLC is the Kverneland & Vicon DLC, which contains 20 pieces of equipment from Kverneland aVicon, such as the FastBale; a non-stop round baler wrapper. A seventh DLC, Alpine Farming was released on  November 12, 2020. It features a new map, dubbed 'Erlengrat' as well as new licensed machinery, including AEBI and Rigitrac, as well as the return of Bührer. Farming Simulator 19: Ambassador Edition, which includes the base game, along with its two expansions and six DLC, was announced is due to release on PC, PlayStation 4 and Xbox One on June 21 2022.

Farming Simulator C64 Edition
Released alongside Farming Simulator 19 as a Collector's Edition bonus for the PC version.

Farming Simulator 20
Farming Simulator 20 was released on December 3, 2019, on Nintendo Switch in North America and Europe, and was released in Japan on May 28, 2020. It looks to be based on Farming Simulator 19's rendering engine, and also includes many features from said title.

Farming Simulator 22
Farming Simulator 22 was released on November 22, 2021. It features a seasonal cycle, gear shifting, production chains for harvested crops and livestock products, new crops in the form of grapes, olives and sorghum and over 400 vehicles and implements. Also new is compatibility with DirectX 12, parallax occlusion mapping, occlusion culling, texture streaming and temporal anti-aliasing.

Mobile

Farming Simulator 2012 

Farming Simulator 2012 was released for the Nintendo 3DS, iOS, and Android in 2012. The 3DS version also supported 3D graphics.

Farming Simulator 14 
Farming Simulator 14 was released for iOS, Android, Nintendo 3DS, Windows Phone and PlayStation Vita on November 18, 2013, and gives a more polished and more casual gaming experience on mobile platforms than its predecessors. There are 10-20 brands in the game.

Farming Simulator 16 
Farming Simulator 16 was released for iOS, Android, Windows Phone, and PlayStation Vita on May 8, 2015.

Farming Simulator 18 
The game was announced for release on the Nintendo 3DS, iOS, Android, and PlayStation Vita. It was released on June 6, 2017. The game has a total of 28 drivable vehicles, and 48 pieces of equipment. This game features a map representing the American desert/grasslands.

Farming Simulator 20 
The game was released for iOS and Android on December 3, 2019. The game feature a total of 25 driveable vehicles and 91 pieces of equipment. While it does feature more drivable vehicles and equipment, it lacks many features like lumber, and frontloaders. Unlike recent versions, Farming Simulator 20 includes new features like; varied terrain, vehicle suspension, first person, the ability to walk around, several new profitable crops livestock, an updated economy, and a brand new rendering engine resembling that of Farming Simulator 19.

Release history 

There are 8 main series titles with 5 mobile titles, including the 2017 Nintendo Switch standalone edition.

Reception 

Reception of the Farming Simulator series has been mixed across all titles, with critics praising its sense of relaxation and array of realistic machinery and vehicles. Some have criticised the games for their repetition and lack of interesting mechanics, while others argue such qualities should be expected in a simulator. Though the series targets the audience that are knowledgeable in the farming industry, the series is generally liked by both farmers and non-farmers alike.

Notes

References

External links 

Android (operating system) games
Farming video games
IOS games
MacOS games
Open-world video games
PlayStation 3 games
PlayStation Vita games
Simulation video games
Windows games
Nintendo Switch games
Video games developed in Switzerland
Xbox 360 games
Multiplayer and single-player video games
Xbox One games
PlayStation 4 games
Xbox Series X and Series S games
PlayStation 5 games
Lua (programming language)-scripted video games
2008 video games
2009 video games
2010 video games
2012 video games
2013 video games
2014 video games
2015 video games
2016 video games
2017 video games
2018 video games
Focus Entertainment games
Stadia games
Video game franchises introduced in 2008